Ohridohauffenia is a genus of very small freshwater snails with an operculum, aquatic gastropod mollusks in the family Hydrobiidae, the river snails.

Species
Species within the genus Ohridohauffenia include:
 Ohridohauffenia depressa Radoman, 1964
 Ohridohauffenia drimica Radoman, 1964
Ohridohauffenia minuta Radoman, 1955
Ohridohauffenia rotonda Radoman, 1964
Ohridohauffenia sanctinaumi Radoman, 1964
Ohridohauffenia sublitoralis Radoman, 1963

References

 BioLib info

Hydrobiidae